Anna Maree Dodd (born 24 October 1980) is a New Zealand former cricketer who played as a right-arm off break bowler. She appeared in 31 One Day Internationals for New Zealand between 2002 and 2006. She played domestic cricket for Wellington.

Dodd was born in Foxton, in New Zealand's Manawatū-Whanganui region. She was first selected in a New Zealand squad for a tour of India in November and December 2001. That tour was cancelled, but Dodd eventually made her ODI debut against Australia in February 2002. When New Zealand toured Europe later in the year, she took what would be career-best figures against the Netherlands, finishing with 3/13 from five overs. At the 2005 World Cup in South Africa, Dodd played in five of her team's seven matches, taking three wickets with a best of 2/15 against Sri Lanka. Her last international matches came in October 2006, in an ODI series against Australia. She played in 31 ODIs in total, taking 28 wickets.

References

External links
 
 

1980 births
Living people
People from Foxton, New Zealand
New Zealand women cricketers
New Zealand women One Day International cricketers
Wellington Blaze cricketers